D III 88 (sometimes written as DIII 88) is a 1939 German drama film directed by Herbert Maisch and Hans Bertram and starring Christian Kayßler, Otto Wernicke and Heinz Welzel. It was made as a propaganda film with the support of Luftwaffe chief Hermann Göring, and was the last of a series of Nazi aviation films to be made before the outbreak of World War II. It was one of the most commercially successful films released during the Nazi era. It was praised by Joseph Goebbels as "an irreproachable film of national destiny". The title, referring to the serial number of the Albatros D.III flown by one of the characters in the World War I, was an attempt to re-inforce the propaganda link between the modern Luftwaffe and that of World War I.

Synopsis
Two extraordinary young pilots engage in a competitive rivalry and also fight over the same girl. In an effort to show off both fly into a dangerous storm, damaging their planes and are suspended from duty. They are finally convinced by their commanding officer, a veteran of World War I, to use their talents in a more disciplined way for their country.

Cast
 Christian Kayßler as Oberleutnant Mithoff
 Otto Wernicke as Oberwerkmeister Bonicke
 Heinz Welzel as Obergefreiter Fritz Paulsen
 Hermann Braun as Obergefreiter Robert Eckhard
 Adolf Fischer as Gefreiter Zeissler
 Horst Birr as Monteur Hasinger
 Karl Martell as Lt. Ludwig Becker
 Fritz Eberth as Funker Lindner
 Carsta Löck as Bauernmagd Lina
 Paul Otto as General
 Paul Bildt as Stabsarzt der Flugstaffel
 Hans Bernuth as Flieger
 Ernst Dernburg as Adm. beim Manöver
 Erich Dunskus as Bauer
 Heinz Engelmann as Lt. Frank
 Ilse Fürstenberg as Bäuerin
 Malte Jäger as 1. Funker
 Ferry Reich as 2. Funker
 Josef Kamper as Bauernknecht
 Hilde Land as Kantinenwirtin
 Guenther Markert as Marineoffizier
 Hans Meyer-Hanno as Kantinenwirt
 Egon Vogel as Sanitäter
 Eduard von Winterstein as Landarzt
 Wolfgang Staudte as Marineoffizier
 Walter Gross as Funker
 Theo Brandt as Fliegeroffizier

References

Bibliography

External links 
 

1939 films
Films of Nazi Germany
German drama films
1939 drama films
1930s German-language films
German aviation films
Films directed by Hans Bertram
Films directed by Herbert Maisch
German black-and-white films
Tobis Film films
1930s German films